The 1894 Georgetown Hoyas football team represented the Georgetown University during the 1894 college football season.  Georgetown finished the season with a 4–5 record.  Bob Carmody served as player-coach.  They played home games at Georgetown Field.  During the final game against Columbia AC, Shorty Bahen was seriously injured and left partially paralyzed.  He died from his injuries four months later.  Georgetown disbanded its football team for three years as a result.  When the team reformed in 1898, only collegiate opponents were permitted.

Schedule

References

Georgetown
Georgetown Hoyas football seasons
Georgetown football